The Carolina Panthers are an American professional football club based in Charlotte, North Carolina and representing the Carolinas. The team, which plays in the South division of the National Football Conference (NFC) of the National Football League (NFL), began play in 1995 as an expansion team. From 1995-2001, the team was a member of the West division of the NFC.

This list encompasses the major honors won by the Carolina Panthers as well as records set by the team, its coaches, and its players. Attendance records at Bank of America Stadium, the team's home stadium since 1996, are also included in this list. All records are accurate as of the end of the 2017 season.

Honors
NFC championship games
Winners (2): 2003, 2015
Losers (2): 1996, 2005
Division championships
Winners (6): 1996, 2003, 2008, 2013, 2014, 2015
Runners-up (6): 1997, 1999, 2005, 2006, 2007, 2012
Playoff appearances
Appearances (8): 1996, 2003, 2005, 2008, 2013, 2014, 2015, 2017

Retired numbers

Player records

Top scorers (season)

Top scorers (career)

Passing (season)

Passing (career)

Rushing (season)

Rushing (career)

Receiving (season)

Receiving (career)

Sacks (season)

Sacks (career)

Interceptions (season)

Interceptions (career)

Single-game records
Most passing yards in a game: 432 (Cam Newton, September 18, 2011 vs. Green Bay Packers)
Most rushing yards in a game: 210 (DeAngelo Williams, December 30, 2012 at New Orleans Saints)
Most receiving yards in a game: 218 (Steve Smith, January 15, 2006 at Chicago Bears)

Coaching records

First head coach: Dom Capers (1995-98)
Longest-serving head coach: John Fox (2002-2010)
Most regular season games as head coach: John Fox - 144 Games
Most regular season wins for a head coach: Ron Rivera - 76 Wins
Best regular season winning % for a head coach: Ron Rivera - .546
Most playoff appearances as head coach: Ron Rivera - 4 Appearances
Most playoff games as head coach: John Fox - 8 Games
Most playoff wins for a head coach: John Fox - 5 Wins
Best playoff winning % for a head coach: John Fox - .625

Team records

Overall

Games
First game: 20-14 win over Jacksonville (July 29, 1995; preseason, Pro Football Hall of Fame Game)
First regular-season game: 23-20 OT loss to Atlanta (September 3, 1995)
First playoff game: 26-17 win over Dallas (January 5, 1997)
First Super Bowl: 32-29 loss to New England (February 1, 2004; Super Bowl XXXVIII)

Record results
Record win: 38-0 vs. Atlanta (December 13, 2015)
Record regular-season win: 38-0 vs. Atlanta (December 13, 2015)
Record playoff win: 23-0 at New York Giants (January 8, 2006)
Record loss: 9-52 at Oakland (December 24, 2000)
Record regular-season loss: 9-52 at Oakland (December 24, 2000)
Record playoff loss: 14-34 at Seattle (January 22, 2006)

Streaks
Longest winning streak (within one season): 14 (2015) 
Longest winning streak (excluding playoffs): 17 (2014 - 2015)
Longest winning streak (Start of season): 14 (2015)
Longest losing streak (regular season): 15 (2001)
Longest losing streak (start of season): 7 (1998)

Wins/losses/ties in a seasons
Most wins (single regular season): 15 (2015) 
Most losses (single regular season): 15 (2001) 
Most ties (single regular season): 1 (2014)
Fewest wins (single regular season): 1 (2001) 
Fewest losses (single regular season): 1 (2015)

Points
Most points scored in a season: 500 (2015)
Least points scored in a season: 196 (2010)
Most points allowed in a season: 429 (2011)
Least points allowed in a season: 218 (1996)
Most points scored in a game: 52 vs. Cincinnati (December 8, 2002)
Most points conceded in a game: 52 at Oakland (December 24, 2000)
Highest points differential in a season: +192 (2015)
Lowest points differential in a season: -212 (2010)

Attendances
Largest home attendance (regular season): 592,454 (2015)
Largest home attendance (single game):
76,136 vs. San Francisco, December 10, 1995 (Memorial Stadium, Clemson, South Carolina)
74,461 vs. Green Bay, November 8, 2015 (Bank of America Stadium, Charlotte, North Carolina)
Largest road attendance (single game): 90,588 at Dallas, September 28, 2009 (AT&T Stadium, Arlington, Texas)

References

Notes
Notes

Footnotes

External links
 ESPN.com. Carolina Panthers News, Schedule, Players, Stats, Video - NFL.
 Carolina Panthers Official Website.

Records
Carolina